The third season of American Ninja Warrior began airing on July 31, 2011, on G4. Tryouts took place in May 2011 at Venice Beach, California. After the tryouts, the top 15 competitors competed in Ninja Warrior Boot Camp with the top 10 moving on to Japan for the finals of the competition as a part of Sasuke 27 and a chance at becoming the first American to conquer the course and win a $500,000 endorsement deal with K-Swiss. No competitors made it beyond stage 3. This season was once again hosted by Matt Iseman and Jimmy Smith, with Alison Haislip as a sideline reporter. The final episode aired on August 22, 2011, as a two-hour primetime special on NBC.

Qualifying
Over 300 competitors took part in the tryouts in Venice Beach, CA on May 16, 2011, and May 17, 2011. Those who made it past qualifying, city finals, and boot-camp in the California Mountains advanced to Stage 1 at Sasuke 27.

Boot Camp
15 competitors from the semi-finals tried ninja Boot Camp. The ninjas were divided into three teams of five: the red dragons, blue monkeys, and white tigers. Ten would make it at the end, and five would be sent home. Every week there would be challenges the 
ninjas would have to face. The losing teams would send two of their members to the heavenly ropes. Two people would be sent up the rope, and the person that hit the buzzer at the top first would move on and continue the boot camp until they either were sent home or made it to "Sasuke 27". The losing person would be sent home, failing to make it to Japan. The five that were eliminated in boot camp were Dustin Rocho, Chris Wilczewski, Brandon Douglass, Alan Conneally, and Brian Orosco.

Notable competitors
 Denver Broncos wide receiver, Matt Willis
 2009 World Champion freerunner, Tim "Livewire" Shieff
 Professional freerunner and Survivor: China contestant, Michael "Frosti" Zernow

Mount Midoriyama

Stage 1

Stage 2

Stage 3

Ratings

References

American Ninja Warrior
2011 American television seasons